Call Me by Your Name may refer to:

 Call Me by Your Name (novel), a 2007 novel by André Aciman
 Call Me by Your Name (film), a 2017 film based on the novel, directed by Luca Guadagnino
 Call Me by Your Name: Original Motion Picture Soundtrack, the soundtrack to the 2017 film Call Me by Your Name
 Call Me by Your Name, a 2015 album by Matthew S and Von Felthen

 "Montero (Call Me by Your Name)", a 2021 song by Lil Nas X